Giacomo Cavalieri (Rome, 1565 – Tivoli, 28 January 1629) was born in Rome in 1565 to Giacomo Cavalieri and Diana Santori, related to the Borghese and Paluzzi Albertoni families. He became referendary of the Tribunal of the Apostolic Signature in the Roman Curia and governor of Faenza and Città di Castello and auditor of the Roman Rota. On 15 September 1623 he was appointed datary of His Holiness.

Pope Urban VIII created him cardinal priest in the consistory of 19 January 1626. He opted for the title of Sant'Eusebio on 9 February 1626. He died on 28 January 1629 in Tivoli.

References

External links

 

1565 births
17th-century Italian cardinals
Cardinals created by Pope Urban VIII
Clergy from Rome
1629 deaths